The Rhode Island White is a breed of chicken originating in the U.S. state of Rhode Island. Despite their very similar names and shared place of origin, the Rhode Island White is a distinct breed from the Rhode Island Red. However, Rhode Island Reds and Whites can be bred together to create Red Sex-Link hybrid chickens, such as the ISA Brown. In Australia, the Rhode Island White is regarded as a color variety of the Rhode Island breed according to the Australian Poultry Standards.

History
Rhode Island Whites arose from the work of J. Alonzo Jocoy of Peacedale, Rhode Island, which began in 1888. Developed through crosses of Partridge Cochins, White Wyandottes, and the rose comb type of White Leghorn, it was solidified as a breed by 1903. It was first accepted into the American Poultry Association's Standard of Perfection in 1922. Moderately popular up until the 1960s, it is now a relatively rare fowl. It is listed on the American Livestock Breeds Conservancy as a breed to watch, with less than 3,000 birds known to have existed circa 2003. Like most standard breeds, it also appears in a bantam variety.

Characteristics
Rhode Island Whites are a dual-purpose fowl suitable for both meat and egg production. Males weigh 8.5 pounds (3.9 kilos) and hens weigh 6.5 pounds (3 kilos). They have a single variety, with pure white plumage, red wattles and earlobes, and a medium size rose comb.

References 
 
 
 

 

Conservation Priority Breeds of the Livestock Conservancy
Chicken breeds
Chicken breeds originating in the United States

it:Rhode Island (pollo)#Colorazioni